SS Irvin S. Cobb was a Liberty ship built in the United States during World War II. She was named after Irvin S. Cobb, an American author, humorist, editor and columnist from Paducah, Kentucky.

Construction
Irvin S. Cobb was laid down on 13 July 1944, under a Maritime Commission (MARCOM) contract, MC hull 2491, by the St. Johns River Shipbuilding Company, Jacksonville, Florida; she was sponsored by Ruth Alexander, the wife of H.F. Alexander, and friend of the namesake, and was launched on 22 August 1944.

History
She was allocated to the Seas Shipping Co., Inc., on 31 August 1944. On 15 July 1949, she was laid up in the National Defense Reserve Fleet, Mobile, Alabama. She was removed from the fleet, 18 July 1967.

References

Bibliography

 
 
 
 

 

Liberty ships
Ships built in Jacksonville, Florida
1944 ships
Mobile Reserve Fleet